Ta Re Moriori is a language-learning app published in March 2021 to teach users the basics of the Moriori language. Moriori went extinct in the beginning of the 1900s. The app was developed by Deving and has a rather small user base of more than 500.

The app was released by Hokotehi Moriori Trust, and it's a part of a 10-year-long project aiming to revive the language, even though there are no known fluent speakers nor recordings of the spoken language. Learning through the app does not require any previous knowledge of the language. It has been released on Android, but an iOS version is being developed.

There's a plan to expand the app to include a dictionary and a phrasebook.

References 

Android (operating system) software
Internet properties established in 2021
Moriori
Language revival
2021 establishments in New Zealand
2021 establishments